1446 Sillanpää, provisional designation , is a stony Florian asteroid from the inner regions of the asteroid belt, approximately 8.2 kilometers in diameter. It was discovered on 26 January 1938, by Finnish astronomer Yrjö Väisälä at Turku Observatory in Southwest Finland. It was later named after writer Frans Eemil Sillanpää.

Orbit and classification 

The S-type asteroid is a member of the Flora family, one of the largest populations of stony asteroids in the main-belt. It orbits the Sun at a distance of 2.0–2.5 AU once every 3 years and 4 months (1,229 days). Its orbit has an eccentricity of 0.10 and an inclination of 5° with respect to the ecliptic.

Lightcurves 

In March 2009, Czech astronomer Petr Pravec obtained a rotational light-curve from photometric observations at Ondřejov Observatory. It gave a well-defined rotation period of 9.6602 hours with a brightness variation of 0.55 magnitude. One month later, a concurring period of 9.659 hours with an amplitude of 0.71 magnitude was obtained by Adrián Galád at Modra Observatory. Photometric observations at the Palomar Transient Factory in December 2011. gave a 9.6597 hours and Δ0.59 in magnitude. A modeled light-curve using data from the Uppsala Asteroid Photometric Catalogue and other data sources, gave a period of 9.65855 hours, as well as a spin axis of (129.0°, 76.0°) in ecliptic coordinates.

Diameter and albedo 

According to the survey carried out by NASA's Wide-field Infrared Survey Explorer with its subsequent NEOWISE mission, Sillanpää measures between 7.35 and 8.76 kilometers in diameter, and its surface has an albedo between 0.21 and 0.327. The Collaborative Asteroid Lightcurve Link assumes an intermediate albedo of 0.24 – derived from 8 Flora, the largest member and namesake of this asteroid family – and calculates a larger diameter of 8.19 kilometers using an absolute magnitude of 12.6.

Naming 

This minor planet was named after one of the most famous Finnish writers, Frans Eemil Sillanpää (1888–1964), first Finnish writer to receive the Nobel Prize in Literature in 1939 (also see List of Laureates since 1901). The official  was published by the Minor Planet Center on 20 February 1976.

References

External links 
 Asteroid Lightcurve Database (LCDB), query form (info )
 Dictionary of Minor Planet Names, Google books
 Asteroids and comets rotation curves, CdR – Observatoire de Genève, Raoul Behrend
 Discovery Circumstances: Numbered Minor Planets (1)-(5000) – Minor Planet Center
 
 

001446
Discoveries by Yrjö Väisälä
Named minor planets
19380126